Slade is a surname of Saxon origin, meaning, variously at different times in different dialects, "a valley, dell, or dingle; an open space between banks or woods; a forest glade; a strip of greensward or of boggy land; the side or slope of a hill."  Earliest known references in England as a surname are found in the southwest, especially in Devon.

Notable people bearing the surname include:

 Acey Slade (born 1974), American musician
 Adolphus Slade (1804–1877), British admiral who became an admiral in the Ottoman Navy
 Adrian Slade (born 1936), British politician
 Alexandra Brewis Slade (born 1965), New Zealand-American anthropologist
 Ambrose Slade, the 1969 name of the glam rock band Slade
 Arthur Slade (born 1967), Canadian writer
 Barbara Slade, writer, creator and producer of children’s programming
 Benjamin Slade (disambiguation)
 Bernard Slade (1930–2019), Canadian playwright and screenwriter
 Bill Slade (1898–1968), English football manager
 Billy Slade (1941–2019), former Welsh cricketer
 Caroline Slade (1886–1975), activist and author
 Chad Slade (American football) (born 1992), American football player
 Chad Slade (born 1982), Samoan rugby union player
 Charles Slade (1797–1834), American politician
 Charlie Slade (1891–1971), English football player and manager
 Chris Slade (born 1946), Welsh drummer
 Christina Slade (born 1953), American academic
 Christopher Slade (1927–2022), British judge
 Colin Slade (born 1987), New Zealand rugby union player
 David Slade (born 1969), British director
 Donald Slade (1888–1980), English footballer
 Doug Slade (born 1940), former English cricketer
 Dougie Slade, fictional character
 Dustin Slade (born 1986), Canadian ice hockey goaltender
 Edmond Slade (1859–1928), rear-admiral
 Edwin Slade (1826–1901), American politician
 Elizabeth Slade (born 1949), retired judge of the High Court of England and Wales
 Emma Slade (born 1966), financial analyst
 Felix Slade (1788–1868), British philanthropist
 Frank Slade (1915–1960), former Australian rules footballer
 Frank Slade, lieutenant colonel in film Scent of a Woman (1992 film)
 Frederick Slade, fictional character
 Gerald Osborne Slade (1891–1962)
 Giles Slade (born 1953), Canadian writer and social critic
 Gordon Douglas Slade (born 1955), Canadian mathematician
 Gordon Slade (1904–1974), American baseball player
 Henry Slade (1835–1905), British psychic
 Henry Slade (rugby union) (born 1993), England rugby union player
 Herbert Slade (1851–1913), New Zealand boxer
 Humphrey Slade (1905–1983), Kenyan lawyer and politician
 Ian Slade (born 1968), Welsh international lawn and indoor bowler
 Isaac Slade (born 1981), American musician
 James M. Slade (1812–1875), Vermont politician
 James Slade (1783–1860), Vicar of St Peter's Church
 Jeff Slade (1941–2012), American basketballer
 John Slade (disambiguation), Several individuals of the same name
 Johnny Slade (1932–1991), Australian rugby league footballer
 Joseph Alfred Slade (1831–1864), Western gunslinger
 Julian Slade (1930–2006), English writer
 Kathy Slade (born 1966), Canadian artist, author, curator, editor, and publisher
 Liam Slade (born 1995), English footballer
 Madeleine Slade (Mirabehn), (1892–1982), Indian activist
 Marcus Slade (1801–1872), British Army officer who became Lieutenant Governor of Guernsey
 Margaret Slade, American Canadian economist
 Mark Slade (born 1939), American actor
 Matthew Slade (1569–1628)
 Max Elliott Slade (born 1980), American actor
 Michael Slade (born 1947), author of the Special X series of mystery/horror novels
 Noel Slade, Australian professional rugby league footballer
 Peter Slade (born 1954), former Australian rules footballer
 Priscilla Slade, American academic
 Robert Slade, Canadian information security consultant, researcher, and instructor
 Russell Slade (born 1960), English football manager
 S. Dwight Slade (1849–1931), member of the Wisconsin State Assembly
 Samuel Slade (1753–1829), Church of England clergyman
 Sean Slade (born 1957), record producer, engineer, and mixer
 Simon Slade (born 1982), internet entrepreneur 
 Thomas Slade (1704–1771), English naval architect
 Tim Slade (born 1985), Australian racing driver
 Tom Slade Jr. (1936–2014), American politician
 William Slade (disambiguation)

See also 
 Slade (disambiguation)

References

External links 
 

English-language surnames